Fritz Hoopts (5 June 1875 – 16 May 1945) was a German stage and film actor.

Selected filmography
 Trouble with Jolanthe (1934)
 The Girl from the Marsh Croft (1935)
 Frisians in Peril (1935)
 Uncle Bräsig (1936)
 When the Cock Crows (1936)
 Susanne in the Bath (1936)
 Heimweh (1937)
 Florentine (1937)
 Kameraden auf See (1938)
 Nordlicht (1938)
 Comrades at Sea (1938)
 Robert and Bertram (1939)
 My Daughter Doesn't Do That (1940)
 The Girl from Fano (1941)
 Venus on Trial (1941)
 Uncle Kruger (1941)
 Comrades (1941)
 Rembrandt (1942)
 Much Ado About Nixi (1942)
 Kolberg (1945)
 Elephant Fury (1953)

External links

1875 births
1945 deaths
German male film actors
German male stage actors
People from Oldenburg (city)
20th-century German male actors